Clinton Banducci (born 5 April 1968) is a South African former tennis player.

Banducci qualified for the first round of the 1989 Wimbledon Championships – Mixed Doubles with Heather Ludloff and they defeated Steve DeVries and Rosemary Casals in the first round before losing to the number 4 seeds Robert Seguso and Lori McNeil in the second round. He was a Doubles All-American in 1988 and 1989 whilst playing for TCU Horned Frogs men's tennis at the Texas Christian University.

References

1968 births
Living people
South African male tennis players
White South African people
TCU Horned Frogs men's tennis players
People from Benoni
Sportspeople from Gauteng